Kicker In Tow is Hangedup's second album, released in the fall of 2002 on Montreal's Constellation Records label. It was released on CD and LP, catalogue number  Constellation # CST022-1.

Track listing
"Kinetic Work"
"Sink"
"Losing Your Charm"
"View From the Ground"
"Moment For The Motion Machine"
"No More Bad Future"
"Motorcycle Muffler"
"Automatic Spark Control"
"Broken Reel"

2002 albums
Hangedup albums
Constellation Records (Canada) albums